Anna Vladimirovna Buturlina (born 31 May 1977) is a Russian jazz singer and musical actress.

Career
Buturlina graduated from the music school named after Sergei Prokofiev in piano. Then she entered the Gnesin School of Music. In the third year of study at the conducting and choral department, Buturlin began to sing jazz and after graduating from school she entered Gnessin State Musical College in the pop-jazz department. At the age of 19, she became a soloist of a big band under the management of Anatoly Kroll.

Buturlina toured with the Dixieland "Moscow Ragtime Band" and the big band RAM. Gnesinyh run by Vladimir Andreev. The singer's debut took place in December 1996 with the ensemble Ivan Farmakovsky at the Moscow Autumn Festival. In 1998, cooperation began with the ensemble “JAZZ-ACCORD”. November 23, 1998 in the studio RAM them. Gnesinyh made the first audio recording with the ensemble "Raznyye ludi", which included the famous jazz standard.

Buturlina has recorded vocals for movies and cartoons. Her most iconic works are in Disney animation films, where she voiced two princesses - Tiana (The Princess and the Frog) and Elsa (Frozen and Frozen II). She performed the Russian versions of the songs "Let It Go" from Frozen and "Into the Unknown" from Frozen II.

On February 9, 2020, Buturlina was called to join Idina Menzel, Aurora and eight more of Elsa's international dubbers to perform the song “Into the Unknown” during the 92nd Academy Awards. Every international performer sang one line of the song in a different language: Maria Lucia Heiberg Rosenberg in Danish, Willemijn Verkaik in German, Takako Matsu in Japanese, Carmen Sarahí in Latin American Spanish, Lisa Stokke in Norwegian, Kasia Łaska in Polish, Buturlina in Russian, Gisela in European Spanish and Gam Wichayanee in Thai.

Personal life
Buturlina is married with two daughters, Evdokia (2006) and Antonina (2016).

Discography

Music albums 
 "Black Coffee", 2002
 “My Favorite Songs”, 2006
 “Everything is jazz”, 2017
 "Caution "music"", 2017
 "The key to the kingdom", 2017

References

1977 births
Living people
Singers from Moscow
Russian women singers
Russian jazz singers